Air Force Memorial may refer to:

 United States Air Force Memorial in Arlington, Virginia
 Air Forces Memorial in Runnymede, England
 Royal Air Force Memorial (Albany, Georgia)
 Royal Australian Air Force Memorial, Canberra 
 Royal Australian Air Force Memorial, Brisbane
 South African Air Force Memorial